Andrena confederata, the southern miner, is a species of mining bee in the family Andrenidae. It is found in North America.

References

Further reading

External links

 

confederata
Articles created by Qbugbot
Insects described in 1917